Match Play is a 1930 film directed by Mack Sennett.

Cast
 Walter Hagen	
 Leo Diegel		
 Andy Clyde
 Marjorie Beebe
 Bud Jamison
 William Searby	
 Kathryn Stanley

References

External links
 

1930 films
American black-and-white films
American silent short films
American comedy short films
Films directed by Mack Sennett
Silent American comedy films
1930 comedy films
1930s American films